The Doha Team was a Qatari UCI Continental road cycling team that existed from 2007 to 2009. The team was sponsored by Doha, the capital city of Qatar.

2009 roster

Major wins
2008
 Tour of Libya, Omar Hasanein (2008)
 International Grand Prix Al-Khor, Rafaâ Chtioui (2008)
 International Grand Prix Losail, Abdelbasset Hannachi (2008)
 International Grand Prix Messaeed, Ayman Ben Hassine (2008)
 International Grand Prix Doha, Ayman Ben Hassine (2008)
 H. H. Vice-President's Cup, Badr Mohamed Mirza Bani Hammad 
2009
 Emirates Cup, Ayman Ben Hassine
 H. H. Vice-President's Cup, Ayman Ben Hassine

References 

Cycle racing in Qatar
UCI Continental Teams (Asia)
Cycling teams established in 2007
2007 establishments in Qatar
Cycling teams disestablished in 2009
Defunct cycling teams